Pirzada Qasim Raza Siddiqui (born 8 February 1943) is a Pakistani scholar, poet, scientist and educationist. He is serving as vice chancellor of Ziauddin University.

Early life and career
Pirzada was born on 8 February 1943 to an Urdu-speaking family in Delhi, India. After the Partition of India in 1947, he continued his studies in Pakistan and received his college degrees from D J Science College in Karachi and BSc (H) from University of Karachi. He earned his PhD degree at Newcastle University, England.

Pirzada Qasim started his career as a lecturer at the University of Karachi and became a professor. He has been associated with the University's Department of Physiology since 1960. He also served as Vice-Chancellor at the Federal Urdu University, University of Karachi and Ziauddin University. He has also served as the Chancellor of Nazeer Hussain University. He has written several books in English and Urdu, including Urdu poetry.

References

1943 births
Living people
Alumni of Newcastle University
Muhajir people
Pakistani educators
Pakistani poets
Pakistani scholars
University of Karachi alumni
Urdu-language poets from Pakistan
Vice-Chancellors of the University of Karachi
D. J. Sindh Government Science College alumni
Pakistani neuroscientists
Poets from Karachi
Vice-Chancellors of the Federal Urdu University